The 1947 Morgan State Bears football team was an American football team that represented Morgan State College in the Colored Intercollegiate Athletic Association (CIAA) during the 1947 college football season. In their 19th season under head coach Edward P. Hurt, the Bears compiled a 5–2–1 record and outscored opponents by a total of 104 to 62. The team ranked No. 9 among the nation's black college football teams according to the Pittsburgh Courier and its Dickinson Rating System. Their only losses were to No. 7 Virginia State and No. 11 Howard.

Schedule

References

Morgan State
Morgan State Bears football seasons
Morgan State Bears football